The 1988 Stevenage Borough Council election took place on 5 May 1988. This was on the same day as other local elections. One third of the council was up for election; the seats which were last contested in 1984. The Labour Party retained control of the council, which it had held continuously since its creation in 1973.

Overall results

|-bgcolor=#F6F6F6
| colspan=2 style="text-align: right; margin-right: 1em" | Total
| style="text-align: right;" | 13
| colspan=5 |
| style="text-align: right;" | 23,414
| style="text-align: right;" | 
|-
|colspan="11" bgcolor=""|
|-
| style="background:"|
| colspan="10"| Labour hold

All comparisons in seats and vote share are to the corresponding 1984 election.

Ward results

Bandley Hill

Bedwell Plash

Chells

Longmeadow

Martins Wood

Mobbsbury

Monkswood

Old Stevenage

Pin Green

Roebuck

St Nicholas

Shephall

Symonds Green

References

1988
1988 English local elections
1980s in Hertfordshire